Joshua Stevenson Baker (born December 25, 1986) is a former American football tight end. He played college football at Northwest Missouri State and the University of Delaware. He played high school football at Western Branch High School.

College career
Baker began his college career at the University of Delaware in 2005. Although among the team's top scout team players, Baker did not participate in a formal match-up that year. In 2006, he was named the Blue Hens' third string tight end appearing in ten games in a back-up role primarily on running plays and special teams. Baker recorded one catch for no yards and had a 14-yard kickoff return. In 2007, Baker was named the second string tight end and ranked sixth on the team in receiving, totaling 20 catches for 344 yards and 2 touchdowns. In 2008, Baker was suspended from the team for a year after violating the school's three strike policy which included incidents such as underage drinking and having a lit candle in his dorm room.

Baker went to live with his father in Waco, Texas, where he attended Collin County Community College and worked at an OfficeMax earning $9.00 an hour, which went toward his community college fees. He also worked with a professional trainer to stay in shape. Delaware retained Baker's athletic scholarship and he returned for his redshirt senior season in 2009. Baker tore multiple knee ligaments in the first quarter of the Blue Hens' first game of the year, ending his season.

Baker was denied a medical redshirt and transferred to Division II Northwest Missouri State. Baker had 66 catches for 838 yards and a touchdown, and 3 rushing touchdowns for Missouri in 2010 and was named to the Associated Press' Little All-America Team.

Professional career

New York Jets
The New York Jets signed Baker as an undrafted free agent on July 27, 2011. To meet the roster requirement, Baker was waived by the Jets on September 3. He was signed to the team's practice squad a day later. Baker was called up to the active roster on September 27, 2011, following a season-ending injury to tight end Jeff Cumberland. On December 24, 2011, he caught his first career touchdown against the New York Giants. In 11 games of 2011, Baker made 3 receptions for 27 yards and a touchdown. He also returned 3 punts for 60 return yards.

Baker suffered a severe knee injury on August 26, 2012 and was placed on the team's injured reserve list the following day. He was waived by the Jets on February 19, 2013.

Tampa Bay Buccaneers
Baker signed with the Tampa Bay Buccaneers on April 1, 2014. He was waived by the Bucs on May 12, 2014.

References

External links
 Tampa Bay Buccaneers bio
 New York Jets bio
 Northwest Missouri Bearcats bio
 Delaware Fighting Blue Hens bio

1986 births
Living people
Sportspeople from Chesapeake, Virginia
Players of American football from Virginia
American football tight ends
Northwest Missouri State Bearcats football players
Delaware Fightin' Blue Hens football players
New York Jets players
Tampa Bay Buccaneers players